The Anderson Valley Advertiser is a small weekly tabloid published in Anderson Valley, California. It was founded in 1955 as a local, community-based paper. The AVA'''s masthead features mottoes borrowed from the French Revolution and the Industrial Workers of the World:Fanning the Flames of Discontent! (The IWW's Little Red Songbook is sub-titled "To Fan the Flames of Discontent")Peace to the Cottages! War on the Palaces! (The motto of Georg Büchner's Hessian Courier)All Happy - None Rich - None Poor''

Various quotations are distributed through every issue of the paper. Examples include:

"Be as radical as reality." - Lenin
"Newspapers should have no friends." - Joseph Pulitzer

Contributors include:

Robert Mailer Anderson
Alexander Cockburn
Jeffrey St. Clair
Flynn Washburne

Bruce Anderson has owned and edited the Anderson Valley Advertiser since January 1984. He left the AVA, as the paper is known, in 2004 for Oregon where he tried to start another weekly. It failed and Anderson bought the AVA back in July 2007. The paper enjoys a modest national circulation. Its masthead bills it as "America's last newspaper." The paper is unique in that it is  based in the rural community of Boonville, Mendocino County, California, but features much leftwing opinion wrapped around local sports, school board reports, profiles of local characters, and impressively detailed stories on local controversies-- although it doesn't always interview all parties involved in the incident that it is reporting (so it's more of a tabloid, than actual news). Anderson describes himself as "a socialist with strong, nay overwhelming, anarchist instincts."

External links

Weekly newspapers published in California
Companies based in Mendocino County, California
1955 establishments in California